is a Japanese comedy duo formed in 1994 by Tetsuya Yanagihara (born September 1, 1972) and Yoshiyuki Hirai (born March 12, 1973).

Appearances
 Sakiyomi Jan Bang!
 Shiseido (Uno)
 Kochikame
 Reborn!
 Jewel Pet
 Natsume Yujincho
 YatterMan
 Tanken Driland
 Professor Layton Series

External links
 Official profile 

Japanese comedy duos
1972 births
Living people